Ringneraha  is a village development committee in Palpa District in the Lumbini Zone of southern Nepal. Ringneraha is a fourth-order administrative division and is located in Lumbinī Zone, Western Region, Nepal. At the time of the 1991 Nepal census it had a population of 2285 people living in 401 individual households.

References

Populated places in Palpa District